A progressive dinner or, more recently, safari supper, is a dinner party with successive courses prepared and eaten at the residences of different hosts. Usually this involves the consumption of one course at each location. Involving travel, it is a variant on a potluck dinner and is sometimes known as a round-robin. 

An alternative is to have each course at a different dining area within a single large establishment.

Safari supper
In a safari supper, the destination of the next course is generally unknown by the participants, and they have to decipher a clue before moving on. Participants go to each house for the various courses. Often there is a regional theme for each dinner, such as Italian, German, or French. Various wines to suit the courses are often served at each location.

A challenge is keeping the food warm and ready at each location. An alternative is to have the courses at different restaurants. This style of eating has recently become popular as a charity fundraiser in rural Britain and is seen as a good way of meeting different neighbors in the community by virtue of each participant having  separate guests.

Safari supper (dish)
No doubt inspired by the Safari Supper children's TV dinner released in the USA by Libby's in 1970, containing fried chicken, alphabet spaghetti, meatballs and tomato sauce, corn and potatoes, chocolate pudding, and chocolate milk flavouring, the term "safari supper" can also be used to describe a type of baked curry consisting of ground beef and rice in a spicy-sweet sauce.( )

References in literature 
 The Safari Party: A Comedy (2002), a play in three acts by Tim Firth.

See also
 List of dining events

Footnotes

External links
Progressive dinner tips
Organization tips at wikihow.com
Organisation de Diner-Progressif 

Eating parties
Dinner
Courses (food)